Black Hand extortion was a criminal tactic used by gangsters based in major cities in the  United States. In Chicago, Black Hand extortion began around 1900 and had all but faded away by 1920, replaced by the Mafia. The Mafia was initially organized by Johnny Torrio and further organized by Al Capone into the extant Chicago Outfit sometime later.
Black Handers in Chicago were mostly Italian men from Calabria and Sicily who would send anonymous extortion notes to their victims emblazoned with a feared old country symbol: the "Black Hand". The Black Hand was a precursor of organized crime, although it is still a tactic practiced by the Mafia and used in organized crime to this day. The Black Hand gangsters of this time period differed from the Mafia by lacking formally structured hierarchies and codes of conduct, and many were essentially one-man operations. Black Hand blackmail was also common in New York, Boston, and New Orleans. Victims would be threatened with being beaten, shot, or have their place of business bombed if they did not pay. Starting around 1909, Black Hand activity was causing difficulties for mob boss Big Jim Colosimo, a former Black Hand gangster and owner of brothels throughout Chicago. Colosimo's life was being threatened with demands for cash to ensure his physical safety. In an effort to fix the problem, he recruited Johnny Torrio, who was a member of New York's Five Points Gang at the time,  to come to Chicago. Torrio would later become the famous successor to Big Jim Colosimo and mentor Al Capone as the organized crime ruler of Chicago.

Johnny Torrio/Filippo Catalano
The notorious Johnny Torrio (January 20, 1882 – April 16, 1957), also known as "The Fox", was born Giovanni Torrio in Montepeloso, a village in Basilicata region, Southern Italy. He was alleged to have killed ten Black Hand gangsters in his first two months in Chicago. Of the ten men he was alleged to have killed, Filippo Catalano was one of them.

Filippo Catalano was an alleged Black Hand gangster in Chicago in the early 1900s. He was born in 1874 in Gioia Tauro, a coastal village in Southern Italy located in the region of Calabria. Catalano came to the United States and eventually owned and operated a saloon in Chicago. He was connected to the Chicago criminal night life. It was said of Catalano that he was "hated and feared by his countrymen" in the Italian colony, according to the central investigator of his murder- Capt. Cudmore of the 3rd Precinct Chicago Police. On the evening of June 5, 1910, Filippo Catalano was shot five times and died one hour later in the People's Hospital. Before he died, he observed the gangland principle of omertà (total silence), and never mentioned the name of his assailant. It was common for Italian/ Sicilian men not to identify their assailant to the police. Although an investigation turned up the name Eugeno Monaco as the murderer, Filippo Catalano was allegedly killed by Johnny Torrio. Monaco may have been the triggerman working for Torrio.

Black Hand Assassination
On March 27, Filippo Catalano (from above) was alleged to have shot John Jocko in front of 1821 South State Street. Witnesses identified Catalano as the shooter, but the victim, who survived the shooting, would not prosecute. Catalano was eventually released. Later that year, Catalano was murdered (as described above). He was in the Vesuvius restaurant- a place frequented by Chicago's night life. On June 5, 1910, Catalano walked out of the restaurant at approximately 3 a.m. with Edgar K Accetta, a New York lawyer in town on business, and a third man, Eugeno Monaco. The three men were walking toward an approaching car when Monaco allegedly drew a revolver and shot Catalano five times. Catalano's killer fled the scene on foot. He escaped, and his traces ended at the Rock Island Pacific Railroad tracks where he disappeared. Filippo Catalano's death occurred within the 1909-1911 time period that Johnny Torrio was assigned to assassinate Chicago Black Hand gangsters who were extorting his uncle. It is believed he was behind Catalano's murder. By 1920, Black Hand activity had all but faded. Johnny Torrio went on to run and organize the Chicago Outfit.

Giordiani case
Another death was that of Maria Giordiani in 1911. She was a 4 year old Italian immigrant child whose body was found with a gunshot wound on her bedroom floor. Her parents were Ricardo Giordiani, an Italian immigrant, and Eleanor Giodiani, an immigrant of a different European country. They went missing and were never found. It is alleged that the Giordiani family had been targeted by Black Hand members. This case is a mystery. Not much is understood about the death of the family, although insight was gained through the remains of Maria. It is believed that Maria was killed in a Black Hand attack that was targeting Ricardo. The attack probably occurred due to debt owed by Ricardo, which had been exacerbated by the closing of his corporation. As a child, Ricardo also had involvement with the Mafia through his father. Maria is believed to have been targeted to terrorize parents of other families in the area. All that was found left in the apartment was a small doll, a book titled "Roman de la Rose", and a shawl that belonged to Eleanor.

Timeline
1910 - Chicago police arrest over 200 known Italian gangsters and Black Hand members in a raid in Little Italy. However, none are convicted because many of the notes which contained extortion threats could not be traced to them.
March 15, 1910 - The Chicago Vice Commission, a civic organization to close the brothels and panel houses of the Levee district, is organized.
1910 - Chicago racketeer Big Jim Colosimo brings his nephew Johnny Torrio, then with New York's Five Points Gang, to Chicago to eliminate Black Hand member in the city due to their extortion demands. Within a month, ten Black Hand extortionists had been killed.
1910 - Jim Cosmano, a major Chicago Black Hand leader, is severely wounded in an ambush by Johnny Torrio on a South Side bridge. Cosmano had previously demanded $10,000 and threatened to destroy Colosimo's cafe.
June 6, 1910 Filippo Catalano an alleged Black hand extortionist is gunned down after leaving the Vesuvius Restaurant.
January 1-March 26, 1911 - Thirty-eight Black Hand victims are killed by Black Hand assassins, many by the unidentified assassin known only as Shotgun Man, between Oak Street and Milton Street in Chicago's Little Italy.

References
Chicago Daily Tribune June 6, 1910
Chicago Daily Tribune June 11, 1910

Sources

Organized crime history of Chicago
Italian-American culture in Chicago
Chicago Outfit